Leonard Haber (March 21, 1933 – May 1, 2015) was an American psychologist, politician, radio show host and Mayor of Miami Beach, Florida (1977–1979). He was a radio and TV news commentator.

Biography
Haber was born on March 21, 1933 in The Bronx, New York City. Haber was one of three children of Sally and Max Haber. Her parents also have daughter Sandra and son Arnold. He was graduated from Bronx Community College. Haber was earned his Ph.D from Adelphi University in New York. From Adelphi University, Haber moved to Miami Beach and established his private practice. Haber was hosted in the popular radio show "At Your Service" on WKAT. Haber also served as the city psychologist for Miami Beach. Haber first joined the Miami Beach commission in 1971. Haber moved back to Miami in 2012. Haber died on May 1, 2015 at the age of 82. Memorial services were held at Temple Beth Sholom in Miami Beach.

See also 
 List of mayors of Miami Beach, Florida

References

External links
 

1933 births
2015 deaths
Mayors of Miami Beach, Florida
20th-century American psychologists
American radio personalities
Radio personalities from Miami
Television personalities from New York City
Jewish mayors of places in the United States
People from Miami Beach, Florida
People from the Bronx
Bronx Community College alumni
21st-century American Jews